Mariia Sakharuk (née Filyuk) (born 14 October 1995) is a Ukrainian racewalking athlete. She competed in the women's 20 kilometres walk at the 2020 Summer Olympics.

References

External links 
 

 

1995 births
Living people
Ukrainian female racewalkers
Athletes (track and field) at the 2020 Summer Olympics
Olympic athletes of Ukraine